Cowralepis is an extinct genus of phyllolepid placoderm of Givetian Cowra, New South Wales, and several juveniles of various stages of growth have also been discovered.

References

Placoderms of Australia
Phyllolepids
Fossil taxa described in 2005